The NWA International Tag Team Championship was a professional wrestling tag team championship in Georgia Championship Wrestling (GCW). A secondary title after the NWA World Tag Team Championship (Georgia version), it was one of several international tag team championships recognized by the National Wrestling Alliance. It was the first NWA tag team championship to be billed as an "international" title and active from 1956 to 1963.

Some reigns were held by champions using a ring name, while others used their real name. There have been a total of 34 recognized individual champions and 23 recognized teams, who have had a combined 28 official reigns. The first champions were Fred Atkins and Ike Eakins, and the final champions were Ray Gunkel and Dick Steinborn. At 63 days, Ray Gunkel and Ron Etchison's first and only reign was the longest, while the team of Karl Heinkler and Kurt Von Brauner's reign was the shortest, at seven days.

Five teams - Don McIntyre and Red McIntyre, Freddie Blassie and Bob Shipp, Ray Gunkel and Don McIntyre, Ray Gunkel and Dick Steinborn, and Tarzan Tyler and Len Montana - are tied with the most reigns with two each. Gunkel has the most individual reigns with seven. The following is a chronological list of teams that have been International Tag Team Champions by ring name.

Title history

Footnotes

References
General

Specific

External links
NWA International Tag Team Championship (Georgia version) at Wrestlingdata.com

1956 establishments in Georgia (U.S. state)
1963 disestablishments in Georgia (U.S. state)
Wrestling competitions in the United States
International professional wrestling championships